HMS Prefect (Z263) was a net laying ship for the Royal Navy during the Second World War acquired from the United States Navy in June 1944 via Lend-Lease.

On 17 January 1944, while still under construction, the ship was reclassified as a net laying ship and redesignated AN-75. Prefect was launched on 8 March and completed on 3 June.

After delivery to the U.S. Navy on 3 June, she was transferred to the United Kingdom under Lend-Lease the same day and commissioned into the Royal Navy as HMS Prefect (Z263). Upon completion of wartime duty with the United Kingdom, she arrived at Norfolk, Virginia, on 22 October 1945 and was returned to the U.S. Navy on 28 December 1945. Struck from the Naval Vessel Register on 28 March 1946, she was transferred 3 April 1947 to the United States Maritime Commission and sold.

References 
 
 YN-88 / AN-75 Prefect, HMS Prefect (Z-263)

 

Ailanthus-class boom defence vessels of the Royal Navy
Ships built in Wilmington, Delaware
1944 ships
World War II net laying ships
American Car and Foundry Company